The list of ship launches in 1969 includes a chronological list of ships launched in 1969.  In cases where no official launching ceremony was held, the date built or completed may be used instead.


References 

Sources

1969
 Ship launches
 Ship launches
Ship launches